Flight to Jordan is an album by American pianist Duke Jordan recorded in 1960 and released on the Blue Note label.

Reception

The Allmusic review by Scott Yanow awarded the album 5 stars and stated "the music has plenty of strong melodies and variety. This is one of Duke Jordan's better recordings and is quite enjoyable".

Track listing
All compositions by Duke Jordan except as indicated
 "Flight to Jordan" - 5:32
 "Star Brite" - 7:49
 "Squawkin'" - 5:00
 "Deacon Joe" - 8:43
 "Split Quick" - 5:11
 "Si-Joya" (No Problem) - 6:46
 "Diamond Stud" - 5:04 Bonus track on CD reissue
 "I Should Care" (Sammy Cahn, Axel Stordahl, Paul Weston) - 3:49 Bonus track on CD reissue
Recorded at Van Gelder Studio, Englewood Cliffs, New Jersey on August 4, 1960.

Personnel
Duke Jordan - piano - solo track 8
Dizzy Reece - trumpet
Stanley Turrentine - tenor saxophone
Reggie Workman - bass
Art Taylor - drums

References

Blue Note Records albums
Duke Jordan albums
1960 albums
Albums produced by Alfred Lion
Albums recorded at Van Gelder Studio